Hurricane Jeanne was a Category 3 hurricane that struck the Caribbean and the Eastern United States in September 2004. It was the deadliest hurricane in the Atlantic basin since Mitch in 1998. It was the tenth named storm, the seventh hurricane, and the fifth major hurricane of the season, as well as the third hurricane and fourth named storm of the season to make landfall in Florida. After wreaking havoc on Hispaniola, Jeanne struggled to reorganize, eventually strengthening and performing a complete loop over the open Atlantic. It headed westwards, strengthening into a Category 3 hurricane and passing over the islands of Great Abaco and Grand Bahama in the Bahamas on September 25. Jeanne made landfall later in the day in Florida just two miles (three kilometers) from where Hurricane Frances had struck a mere three weeks earlier.

Building on the rainfall of Frances and Hurricane Ivan, Jeanne brought near-record flood levels as far north as West Virginia and New Jersey before its remnants turned east into the open Atlantic.  Jeanne is blamed for at least 3,006 deaths in Haiti with about 2,800 in Gonaïves alone, which was nearly washed away by floods and mudslides. The storm also caused 8 deaths in Puerto Rico, 18 in the Dominican Republic and 5 in the rest of the United States, bringing the total number of deaths to at least 3,037, making Hurricane Jeanne one of the deadliest Atlantic hurricanes ever recorded. Final property damage in the continental United States was $7.5 billion, plus an additional $270 million in the Dominican Republic and $169.5 million in Puerto Rico.

Meteorological history

Tropical Depression Eleven formed from a tropical wave 70 miles (110 km) east-southeast of Guadeloupe in the evening of September 13, and was upgraded to Tropical Storm Jeanne the next day. Jeanne passed south of the U.S. Virgin Islands on September 15, making landfall near Yabucoa, Puerto Rico later the same day. After crossing Puerto Rico, Jeanne reached hurricane strength on September 16 near the eastern tip of the Dominican Republic on the island of Hispaniola, but fell back to tropical storm strength later that day as it moved across the mountainous island. Jeanne moved offshore the Dominican Republic late in the afternoon of September 17. By that time, Jeanne had weakened to tropical depression strength. Even though Jeanne did not strike Haiti directly, the storm was large enough to cause flooding and mudslides, particularly in the northwestern part of the country.

On September 18, while the system was being tracked near Great Inagua and Haiti, a new center formed well to the northeast and the previous circulation dissipated.  The system restrengthened, becoming a hurricane on September 20. Jeanne continued to meander for several days (making a complete loop in the process) before beginning a steady westward motion toward the Bahamas and Florida.

Jeanne continued strengthening as it headed west, passing over Great Abaco in the Bahamas on the morning of September 25. Shortly thereafter, the hurricane reached Category 3 strength. Jeanne maintained this intensity as it passed Grand Bahama Island.  At 11:50 p.m. EDT on September 25 (0350 UTC September 26), Jeanne made landfall on Hutchinson Island, just east of Sewall's Point, Florida; Stuart, Florida; and Port Saint Lucie, Florida, at Category 3 strength. This is the same place Hurricane Frances struck Florida three weeks earlier.

Jeanne's track continued to follow within  of that of Frances until it reached Pasco County. The cyclone then swung more rapidly to the north, and the center remained over land all the way to the Georgia state line, unlike Frances which exited into the Gulf of Mexico.  Jeanne became an extratropical cyclone over Virginia on September 28 and the system moved back into the Atlantic offshore the New Jersey coast the next day.

Preparations

Puerto Rico and the Leeward Islands
On the afternoon of September 13, tropical storm watches were issued for the British Virgin Islands, Saba, St. Eustatius, and St. Maarten while tropical storm warnings were raised for Puerto Rico and the U.S. Virgin Islands.  The watches were upgraded to tropical storm warnings early on the morning of September 14.  Later in the morning, tropical storm warnings were issued for St. Kitts and Nevis, while tropical storm watches were issued for Anguilla.  During the afternoon, tropical storm warnings were lowered for Saba, St. Eustatius, and St. Maarten, while hurricane warnings were issued for Puerto Rico and the U.S. Virgin Islands.  Late on the morning of September 15, a hurricane watch was issued for the British Virgin Islands.  That afternoon, tropical storm warnings were dropped for St. Kitts and Nevis, while hurricane warnings were lowered to tropical storm warnings for the U.S. Virgin Islands.  On the evening of September 15, tropical storm warnings were dropped Puerto Rico and the U.S. Virgin Islands, while hurricane warnings were downgraded to tropical storm warnings for Puerto Rico, and all watches and warnings were dropped for the British Virgin Islands.  The entire power grid of Puerto Rico was shut down by the government of Sila María Calderón as the storm approached to prevent electrocutions and infrastructure damage.

Dominican Republic and Haiti

Tropical storm watches were issued from Cabrera to Isla Saona early in the afternoon on September 14.  Later that afternoon, hurricane watches and tropical storm warnings were raised from Cabrera to Santo Domingo.  Late in the morning of September 15, hurricane warnings were issued from Cabrera to Isla Saona, while hurricane watches and tropical storm warnings were raised from Cabrera to Puerto Plata. That evening, hurricane warnings were extended westward from Cabrera to Puerto Plata while hurricane watches and tropical storm warnings were issued from Puerto Plata to Monte Cristi.  Late in the morning of September 16, tropical storm warnings were issued from Môle-Saint-Nicolas to Puerto Plata. That afternoon, hurricane warnings were downgraded to tropical storm warnings from Puerto Plata to Isla Saona while all hurricane watches were dropped.  Late on the afternoon of September 17, tropical storm warnings were dropped for the remainder of Hispaniola.

Bahamas
In the Bahamas, the first hurricane watch was issued at 2100 UTC on September 15 and included Acklins and Crooked Islands, Inagua, Mayaguana, Ragged Island, and Turks and Caicos Islands. By 1500 UTC the next day, that hurricane watch was upgraded to a hurricane warning. Simultaneously, another hurricane watch became in effect for Cat Island, Exuma, Long Island, Rum Cay, and San Salvador. The hurricane warning was downgraded to a tropical storm warning at 2100 UTC on September 17, while the hurricane watch was lowered to a tropical storm watch. Both the tropical storm warning and tropical storm watch were discontinued at 1000 UTC on September 19.

Although Jeanne then tracked away from the Bahamas, the storm was threatening the archipelago again by September 23. As a result, the tropical storm watch for Cat Island, Exumas, Long Island, Rum Cay and San Salvador was resulted at 0900 UTC. A hurricane watch was then issued for the northwestern Bahamas by 1730 UTC on September 23. Around 0900 UTC the next day, a hurricane warning was posted for Abaco Islands, Andros Islands, Berry Islands, Bimini, Eleuthera, Grand Bahama Island, and New Providence, while a tropical storm watch was simultaneously issued for Cat Island, Exumas, Long Island, Rum Cay, and San Salvador. Late on September 25, the tropical storm warning was canceled. Early on the following day, the hurricane warning was downgraded to a tropical storm warning for Abaco Islands, Berry Islands, Bimini and Grand Bahama Island, while the remaining portion – Andros Islands, Eleuthera and New Providence – was discontinued. All tropical cyclone warnings and watches were canceled by 0900 UTC on September 26.
 
Because Hurricane Frances struck only about two week prior, numerous houses were still patched with plastic sheeting on their roofs, while other residents were still living with neighbors or relatives. Officials urged residents in low-lying homes to evacuate. Shelters were set up at the churches and schools on Abaco Islands, Eleuthera, Grand Bahama. At least 700 people went to a shelter in Abaco Islands alone.

Florida

Preparations in Central Florida were rushed and sudden, as it did not become apparent that the storm would make a direct hit until the morning of the 23rd. Indeed, it had appeared the storm would pass safely offshore just the night before. Voluntary evacuations were advised on Thursday and Friday, plans for opening shelters on Saturday were distributed to the public, and Florida Power and Light warned that power could be out "for an extended period of time". Canals were also drained on the same day.

On Friday, the Palm Beach Zoo prepared for the storm by moving small animals and birds into buildings such as restrooms and restaurants. Evacuations began in earnest, with many residents leaving for the Keys, noting that the islands were the only location definitely out of harm's way. For once, evacuation to the Keys made sense.

The center of Jeanne's eye achieved landfall near Stuart, at virtually the identical spot that Frances had come ashore three weeks earlier, the first time in record keeping that a hurricane made landfall in the same place as a previous storm of the same season. Maximum winds at the time of landfall were estimated to be near 120 mph (193km/h).

Impact

Guadeloupe
The communes of Bouillante, Deshaies, and Pointe-Noire were the hardest hit. In Bouillante, 60 homes were damaged. The storm ruptured water pipes in the city of Bois Malher, isolating about 1,000 people. Damage to businesses resulted in 30 employees being laid-off. Crops also suffered impact, especially bananas. At the Malendure resort, which is located along the coast, the pier, restaurants, and dive base were rendered unusable. In Deshaies, 110 homes were severely damaged, including 60 in the city of Ferry. About a dozen boats were beached or capsized. Many roads and bridges were inflicted with damage.

In Point-Noire, nearly 300 single-family homes were damaged or demolished. Three bridges were destroyed, while numerous roads were also affected. Further south in Vieux-Habitants, roads also suffered damage, particularly in the Beaugendre area, leaving a dozen households isolated. A primary school was impacted beyond repairs. In Saint-François, a trench was dug along a major highway to prevent a residential subdivision from flooding.

Puerto Rico

Puerto Rico was impacted by tropical storm force winds and heavy rain, with flooding on a historic scale. The storm made landfall near Maunabo midday on September 15. The storm generally moved northwest through the island, exiting on the northwest coast near the town of Mayagüez around 11 p.m. Jeanne passed directly over the towns of Arroyo, Patillas, Guayama and Salinas on its trip over the Commonwealth. This excessive rainfall resulted in damage to roads, landslides, and collapsed bridges. This resulted in one death and the evacuation of 400 people near the Río Grande de Añasco. A total of eight people were reported dead in Puerto Rico as a result of Jeanne. Damages from the storm were estimated at $169.5 million (2004 USD).

Haiti

By September 17, heavy rains totaling about 13 inches (330 mm) in the northern mountains of Haiti caused severe flooding and mudslides in the department of Artibonite, causing particular damage in the coastal city of Gonaïves, where it affected about 80,000 of the city's 100,000 residents. As of October 6, 2004 the official report counted 3,006 people dead, with 2,826 of those in Gonaïves alone. Another 2,601 people were injured, and 7 people died.

Decades of deforestation left surrounding valleys unable to hold the 30 hours of rain from Hurricane Jeanne, causing massive landslides. Aid trucks were forced to ford floodwaters and mudslides on National Route 1. In addition, the flooding destroyed all of the rice and fruit harvest in the Artibonite which has been regarded as "Haiti's breadbasket". Some residents had buried unclaimed corpses in their backyards. There were also mass burials of bodies tipped into a massive pit from dump trucks, despite objections to their ceremonious nature and discouragement from the World Health Organization, due to the popular but incorrect belief that dead bodies would lead to catastrophic outbreaks of exotic diseases.

Dominican Republic
In the Dominican Republic, the storm dumped torrential flooding rains and killing over two dozen. Damage totaled $270 million (2004 USD).

United States

Millions in Florida were left without electricity, some for the third time in a month. There were five direct deaths in the mainland United States, three in Florida, one in South Carolina and one in Virginia. The final US damage was determined to be around $7.5 billion. It was difficult to isolate this from damage caused by Hurricane Frances (and, around Polk County and Highlands County, from Hurricane Charley as well).

As the storm moved northward east of the Appalachian Mountains, it continued producing heavy rains and flash flooding. Rainfall exceeded 6.00 inches (150 mm) as far north as New Jersey and Pennsylvania, resulting in severe flash flooding in Philadelphia, Pennsylvania and its Pennsylvania and New Jersey suburbs on September 28. Tornadoes also touched down in Wilmington, Delaware and Cherry Hill, New Jersey.

Delaware and Maryland
This led to widespread street flooding and several rivers overflowed their banks. A strong F2 tornado touched down in the state, injuring five people and leaving $1 million in damages. The county airport sustained significant damage, five C-130 cargo planes were damaged, thousands of pounds of jet fuel spilled, and damaged hangars. At a nearby industrial park, metal siding was torn off buildings, windows were shattered and power lines were downed. A self-storage facility sustained substantial damage.

Numerous roads were flooded, including parts of Maryland Route 17. A total of 50 roads were closed due to high water throughout the state. Numerous reports of stranded vehicles were sent to the Emergency Operations Center. In Carroll County, a group of inmates required rescue after the jail they were in flooded. One brief F0 tornado touched down in the state near Solomons, causing minor damage.

Florida

Two tornadoes were spawned by Hurricane Jeanne in Brevard County, both of which tracked through Micco and were of F1 intensity on the Fujita scale. The first tornado moved through a mobile home community, though damage was mainly to trees which were knocked over. In contrast, the second destroyed several mobile homes, resulting in $350,000 (2004 USD) in damage. High winds were reported in the county, with wind gusts of  recorded at the National Weather Service Office in Melbourne. Furthermore, it is estimated that wind gusts in excess of  occurred in the southern portions of the county. In addition, a man in Palm Bay drowned after driving his car into a flooded ditch. Damage in Brevard County was estimated at $320 million (2004 USD).

High winds also significantly affected Lake County. At least 2,800 homes were damaged, 111 of which were destroyed. One fatality occurred after a 91-year-old woman died in a fire, which was started by a candle lit in her home. Damage in Lake County totaled to $8 million (2004 USD), while an additional $8.2 million in loses occurred to the citrus and nursery industry.

In Orange County, high winds were also reported, with a gust to  recorded at the Orlando International Airport. Throughout the county, extensive damage occurred to houses, businesses, and public buildings. Overall, damage was estimated at $40 million (2004 USD).

In Osceola County, hurricane-force wind gusts damaged or destroyed several homes, resulting in $11 million (2004 USD) in damage. Due to heavy rainfall, flash flooding was reported, especially in the northern portions of the county. Streets and roads along U.S. Route 192 were inundated in the vicinity of St. Cloud. Damage to agriculture was also significant, totaling to an $8 million (2004 USD).

Although the storm made landfall well to the south, Indian River County was severely affected due to the right eyewall passing through. One F1 tornado was spawned by the Jeanne in Vero Beach. It moved near the intersection of Florida State Road 60 and Interstate 95, where it felled numerous trees, resulting in approximately $20,000 (2004 USD) in damage. As a result of strong winds, more than 49,300 houses were either damaged or destroyed. An elderly woman was injured while evacuating her home; she died from her injuries a few days later. Damage was severest in Indian River County, with estimates of losses in excess of $2 billion (2004 USD).

As a result of high tides, marinas were damaged at the Fort Pierce Inlet, which, in turn, destroyed numerous boats. Throughout the county, high winds damage or destroyed thousands of homes and businesses, as well as several mobile home communities. One man was injured when he ran his truck over a downed power line. In St. Lucie County, damage was extensive, albeit less than Indian River County, with estimates totaling to $1.2 billion (2004 USD).

Although the storm made landfall in Martin County, affects were less severe in comparison to the counties immediately north. High winds also affected the county, with a wind gust of  reported in Jensen Beach. Overall, more than 4,180 homes were either damaged or destroyed. No fatalities occurred in Martin County, and no damage figures exist.

Damage in Palm Beach County totaled to $260 million (2004 USD).

Hurricane Jeanne also affected areas Miami-Dade County, albeit less severely. Overall, 25,100 power outages were reported and damage totaled to $10 million (2004 USD).

Effects from Hurricane Jeanne were reported as far south as Monroe County. The surge of water inundated a parking lot at the Jewfish Creek Bridge. Due to spring tides and elevated waters in Florida Bay, minor tidal flooding occurred at the Key West International Airport. Property damage was minor, totaling to only $5,000 (2004 USD).

Aftermath

As a result of its impact, the name Jeanne was retired in the spring of 2005, by the World Meteorological Organization's hurricane committee and will never again be used for an Atlantic hurricane. It was replaced with the name Julia ahead of the 2010 Atlantic hurricane season.

See also

 List of Category 3 Atlantic hurricanes
 List of Florida hurricanes (2000–present)
 List of natural disasters in Haiti
 Timeline of the 2004 Atlantic hurricane season
 Hurricane Erin (1995) – a Category 2 hurricane that made landfall in Central Florida and the Florida panhandle, causing moderate damage

References

External links

 
 NHC's public advisory archive on Hurricane Jeanne
 HPC's public advisory archive on TD Jeanne
 Puerto Rico Hurricanes & Tropical Storms

 
Jeanne
Jeanne (2004)
Jeanne
Jeanne
Jeanne
Jeanne
Jeanne
Jeanne
Jeanne
Jeanne
Jeanne
Jeanne
Jeanne
Jeanne
2004 in the Caribbean
2004 in Haiti
2004 in the Dominican Republic
2004 natural disasters in the United States
September 2004 events in North America
September 2004 events in the United States